Lutten (Dutch Low Saxon: Luttn) is a village in the Dutch province of Overijssel.

History 
The village was first mentioned in 1532 as Lotten, and means "low lying place". Lutten developed during the peat excavation of the raised bog. The construction of the  canal stagnated near Lutten around 1830, because the  Ane had not divided up the wilderness in its area. A marke was a form of government with communal land. In 1832, the problem was solved by digging a canal to Slagharen.

Lutten was home to 236 people in 1840. The Dutch Reformed church is an aisleless church with an entrance hall topped by a tower with wooden roof lantern. It was built in 1853. In 1901, the potato starch factory Baanbreker opened in Lutten. The complex is nowadays used by a plastic pipe factory. In 1932, a water tower was built which measures . It is one of two Dutch water towers with a gable roof. The tower is nowadays used as bed and breakfast.

Notable people 
 Gert Heerkes (born 1965), football manager
 Niek Kimmann (born 1996), BMX Racing cyclist and Olympic Champion

Gallery

References 

Populated places in Overijssel
Hardenberg